SYK may refer to:
 Helsingin Suomalainen Yhteiskoulu, middle and high school in Helsinki, Finland
 South Yorkshire, county in England, Chapman code
 Tyrosine-protein kinase SYK, an enzyme
 Sachdev-Ye-Kitaev model